Kurt Wright (born February 7, 1956) is an American Republican politician who was elected and served in the Vermont House of Representatives.  He also served as president of the Burlington City Council. He represented the Chittenden-3-1 Representative District. He was defeated in his 2018 re-election bid after coming in third in a race for 2 house seats. Wright was seen by many as a centrist Republican who was willing to work across party lines. He represented a liberal leaning district. Wright retired from politics and his tenure ended on the council on April 1, 2020; he was succeeded by Democrat Sarah E. Carpenter.

References

1956 births
Living people
Republican Party members of the Vermont House of Representatives
21st-century American politicians
Place of birth missing (living people)
Politicians from Burlington, Vermont
Vermont city council members